Kevin Baldwin, better known by his stage name Stoupe the Enemy of Mankind or simply Stoupe, is an American hip hop producer, DJ, and member of the underground hip hop group Jedi Mind Tricks. Stoupe has worked with only a limited number of artists outside of Jedi Mind Tricks, including 7L & Esoteric, Canibus, Virtuoso and Guru of Gang Starr.

About.com placed him on its list of the "Top 50 Greatest Hip-Hop Producers".

Career
After years as a duo and then a trio, Baldwin left Jedi Mind Tricks in 2011 and Violence Begets Violence would be their only album to not feature Stoupe production. Vinnie Paz stated in a blog on the JMT website that Stoupe had lacked interest in the group and decided to focus on other things in his career, such as his side groups, and that Stoupe would not be producing any of the tracks on the new JMT album. However, Stoupe returned to Jedi Mind Tricks in 2014 and Jus Allah left the group for the second time. Stoupe and Paz worked on a new album called The Thief and the Fallen, which was released on June 2, 2015.

Stoupe's only full-length solo album Decalogue was released on March 31, 2009, under Babygrande Records. It featured a mixture of underground and popular rappers (for instance M.O.P.) performing over Stoupe's productions.
In 2010, Baldwin and long-time associate Liz Fullerton formed a duo together called Dutch and they released their first album A Bright Cold Day on June 8 under Enemy Soil. Fullerton had previously contributed vocals to Jedi Mind Tricks' song Death Messiah.

In 2011, Stoupe released his follow-up album, this time with side project Vespertina, featuring songwriter Lorrie Doriza, who was previously featured in Decalogue, entitled "The Waiting Wolf" on May 10 under his label Dusty Pockets.

In November 2013, as one of the first acts on Stoupe's new production company, Bad Tape Music, Red Martina released their debut Intransit with Stoupe as the producer on all thirteen tracks. 
Other band members are rapper Noesis (from Philadelphia Slick), multi-instrumentalist Ish Quintero, and vocalist Hayley Cass.
In November 2017, Red Martina released their second album, Come On Home.

In 2017, Stoupe teamed up with singer Eamon to co-produce a record called the Golden Rail Motel. Stoupe was not only responsible for the production on this record, but also holds writing credits on some of the songs. The album was well received with critics and songs from the Golden Rail Motel were featured in films and television. The song "You and Only You" was included on the original soundtrack of Ocean's 8, other songs were featured in TV series like Black-ish and Netflix's On My Block.

On July 1, 2019, Stoupe released a cryptic concept album called "they." available only on a limited vinyl run. The project's focus is quoted as "[an] instrumental exploration into markov's dynamics and the human condition." This mostly instrumental album featured co-production by C-Lance and performances by Recognize Ali and Lorrie Doriza.

Production credits

With Jedi Mind Tricks

With Red Martina

With Canibus

Other projects

EPs, singles and other production

References

Place of birth missing (living people)
Hip hop record producers
Living people
Army of the Pharaohs members
Year of birth missing (living people)
Jedi Mind Tricks members